Ewa Bąkowska (2 August 1962 – 10 April 2010) was a Polish librarian, activist and representative of the Katyn Families.

She died in the 2010 Polish Air Force Tu-154 crash near Smolensk on 10 April 2010. She is buried in the Salwator Cemetery. She was posthumously awarded the Order of Polonia Restituta.

Awards
  Bronze Cross of Merit (2001)
 Medal for Long Service (2008)
  Knight's Cross of the Order of Polonia Restituta (2010)

References

1962 births
2010 deaths
Polish librarians
Women librarians
People from Kraków
Jagiellonian University alumni
Burials at Salwator Cemetery
Knights of the Order of Polonia Restituta
Victims of the Smolensk air disaster